Henry Caleb Williams (1832 – August 19, 1871) was a politician in Queensland, Australia. He was a Member of the Queensland Legislative Assembly.

Early life 
Henry Caleb Williams was born in 1832.

Politics 
Williams was the mayor of the then Town of Ipswich between 1868 and 1869.

He was one of three members of the Queensland Legislative Assembly for the Electoral district of Ipswich from 26 September 1868 to 12 August 1870.

Later life 
William died on 19 August 1871 in Weston-super-Mare, Somerset, United Kingdom.

References

Members of the Queensland Legislative Assembly
1832 births
1871 deaths
Place of birth missing
19th-century Australian politicians